Third Thoughts is a 2018 book of 25 essays written by Steven Weinberg, mostly in the decade preceding 2018. Most of the essays were previously published in The New York Review of Books, newspapers, and other periodicals. Essays numbered 20, 23, 24, and 25 are published for the first time in the book. Essay number 6 is the foreword to the 2014 book Time in Powers of Ten. There are 8 essays in the section on science history, 6 essays in the section on physics and cosmology, 6 essays in the section on public matters, and 5 essays in the section on personal matters.

Essays

I. SCIENCE HISTORY
1 The Uses of Astronomy (pp. 3-14); 2009
2 The Art of Discovery (pp. 15-21)
3 From Rutherford to the LHC (pp. 22-35); 2011
4 Educators and Academics, Underground in Texas (pp. 36-38)
5 The Rise of the Standard Models (pp. 39-51); 2013
6 Long Times and Short Times (pp. 52-54)
7 Keeping an Eye on the Present—Whig History of Science (pp. 55-66); 2015
8 The Whig History of Science: An Exchange (pp. 67-70); 2016

II. PHYSICS AND COSMOLOGY
9 What Is an Elementary Particle? (pp. 73-82); 1996
10 The Universe We Still Don’t Know (pp. 83-95); 2011
11 Varieties of Symmetry (pp. 96-111); 2011
12 The Higgs, and Beyond (pp. 112-118); 2011
13 Why the Higgs? (pp. 119-123); 2012
14 The Trouble with Quantum Mechanics (pp. 124-142); 2017

III. PUBLIC MATTERS
15 Obama Gets Space Funding Right (pp. 145-148)
16 The Crisis of Big Science (pp. 149-163); 2012
17 Liberal Disappointment (pp. 164-166); 2012
18 Keep Loopholes Open (pp. 167-170)
19 Against Manned Space Flight (pp. 171-175)
20 Skeptics and Scientists (pp. 176-182)

IV. PERSONAL MATTERS
21 Change Course (pp. 183-184)
22 Writing about Science (pp. 185-191)
23 On Being Wrong (pp. 192-193)
24 The Craft of Science, and the Craft of Art (pp. 194-210)
25 New York to Austin, and Return (pp. 211-214)

Reception
According to Robert P. Crease:

According to Mario Livio:

References

2018 non-fiction books
English-language books
Essay collections
Belknap Press books